Polyommatus anthea is a butterfly in the family Lycaenidae. It was described by Francis Hemming in 1932. It is found in Kurdistan and the Levant.

References

Butterflies described in 1932
Polyommatus
Butterflies of Asia